Bertil Edvard Göransson (9 February 1919 – 10 April 2004) was a Swedish rowing coxswain who competed in the 1956 Summer Olympics. He won a silver medal in the coxed fours and finished fourth in the eights competition. He won two silver medals in these events at the 1955 European Championships.

References

1919 births
2004 deaths
Swedish male rowers
Coxswains (rowing)
Olympic rowers of Sweden
Rowers at the 1956 Summer Olympics
Olympic silver medalists for Sweden
Olympic medalists in rowing
Medalists at the 1956 Summer Olympics
European Rowing Championships medalists
20th-century Swedish people
21st-century Swedish people